Neocollyris richteri is a species of ground beetle in the genus Neocollyris in the subfamily Carabinae. It was described by Horn in 1901.

References

Richteri, Neocollyris
Beetles described in 1901